The Iran–Pakistan border is the international boundary that separates Iran and Pakistan.

Description

The border begins at the tripoint with Afghanistan at the Kuh-i-Malik Salih mountain, then follows a straight line going south-east, then a series of mountain ridges, seasonal streams and the Tahlab river south-west to the vicinity of Hamun-e Mashkel lake. The boundary then veers sharply southwards via a series of straight lines, then east along some mountains to the Mashkil river, which it follows southwards, before reaching the Nahang river which it follows westwards. It leaves the Nahang and then goes overland via various mountains ridges and straight line segments southwards to Gwadar Bay in the Gulf of Oman.

History
The modern boundary cuts through the region known as Balochistan, an area long contested between various empires centred in Persia (Iran), Afghanistan and Pakistan. From the 18th century onwards the British gradually took control of most of India, including what is now Pakistan, bringing it into close proximity with lands traditionally claimed by Persia. In 1871 the British (representing the Khan of Kalat) and the Persians agreed to define their mutual frontier; a boundary commission surveyed the area the following year but did not mark the border on the ground. British penetration of Balochistan, under Sir Robert Groves Sandeman, continued apace over the following decades, prompting a more precise boundary to be agreed and marked with pillars on the ground in 1895–96. Some minor alignment issues stemming from this were tidied up via another joint treaty in 1905.

In 1947, the British departed, and Pakistan gained independence. Iran and Pakistan confirmed their mutual border by treating in 1958–59, fully mapping the border area and demarcating it on the ground with pillars.

Border barriers

Iranian fencing project (2011) 

The 3 ft (91.4 cm) thick and 10 ft (3.05 m) high concrete wall, fortified with steel rods, will span the 700 km frontier stretching from Taftan to Mand. The project will include large earth and stone embankments and deep ditches to deter illegal trade crossings and drug smuggling to both side. The border region is already dotted with police observation towers and fortress-style garrisons for troops. Iran and Pakistan do not have border disputes or other irredentist claims and Pakistan's Foreign Ministry has stated, "Pakistan has no reservation because Iran is constructing the fence on its territory"

History and stated purpose
The  wall is being constructed to stop illegal border crossings and stem the flow of drugs, and is also a response to terror attacks, notably the one in the Iranian border town of Zahedan on February 17, 2007, which killed 13 people, including nine Iranian Revolutionary Guard officials. However Pakistani Foreign Ministry spokeswoman Tasnim Aslam denied any link between the fence and the bomb blast, saying that Iran was not blaming these incidents on Pakistan.

Reactions to the barrier
The Foreign Ministry of Pakistan has said that Iran has the right to erect border fencing in its territory. However, opposition to the construction of the wall was raised in the Provincial Assembly of Balochistan. It maintained that the wall would create problems for the Baloch people whose lands straddle the border region. The community would become further divided politically and socially, with their trade and social activities being seriously impeded. Leader of the Opposition Kachkol Ali said the governments of the two countries had not taken the Baloch into their confidence on this matter, demanded that the construction of the wall be stopped immediately, and appealed to the international community to help the Baloch people.

Pakistani fencing project (2019)

In 2019, Pakistan announced to fence its border with Iran.

In May 2019, Pakistan approved $18.6 Million funds to fence border with Iran.

In September 2021, Pakistan approved $58.5 Million additional funds for border fencing.

As of mid-2021, Pakistan has fenced 46% of border and is expected to be fully fenced by December 2021.

As of January 2022, Pakistan has fenced 80% of border. Interior Ministry stated that remaining border will also be fenced.

Border crossings

On the Pakistani side, the Frontier Corps are responsible for looking after the border security and Immigration. On the Iranian side, the Iranian Revolutionary Guards are responsible for the border security. 

Pakistan drives on the left hand side of the road and Iran drives on the right side of the road. The border crossings are designed for this.

 Mirjaveh (IRN) – Taftan (PAK) (rail and road) 
 Pishin (IRN) – Mand (PAK) (road)

Settlements near the border

Iran

 Lar Marud
Zahedan
 Kacheh Rud
 Mirjaveh
 Ladiz
 Narreh Now
 Jaleq
 Kalleh
 Fahreh
 Murt
 Esfandak
 Kavari
 Pishin
 Kushak

Pakistan

 Sohtagan
 Qila Ladgasht
 Washap
 Sar-i Parom
 Girbum
 Sohrag
 Abdui
 Taftan
 Sirag
 Kurumb
 Jiwani

See also

Iran–Pakistan relations

References

External links

Iran to wall off Baluchistan border, Al Jazeera
’بلوچوں کوتقسیم کیاجا رہا ہے‘, BBC 
Iran raising wall along border with Pakistan

 
border
Borders of Iran
Borders of Pakistan
International borders
Balochistan
Border barriers